Milan Linate Airport  is the third international airport of Milan, the second-largest city and largest urban area of Italy, behind Malpensa Airport and Orio al Serio Airport. It served 9,233,475 passengers in 2018, being the fifth busiest airport in Italy.

History
Linate was completely rebuilt in the 1950s and again in the 1980s.

Its name comes from the small village where it is located in the town of Peschiera Borromeo. Its official name is Airport Enrico Forlanini, after the Italian inventor and aeronautical pioneer born in Milan. Linate airport buildings are located in the Segrate Municipality, and the field is located for a large part in the Peschiera Borromeo Municipality.

That year, 2001, also saw a major accident at Linate with many illegal and non-ICAO-regulation practices and layouts part of its then operation.

From 27 July to 27 October 2019, Linate was closed for runway resurfacing and terminal upgrades. The latter project is expected to continue after the airport's reopening, concluding some time in 2021. During this closure, most flights were rerouted to Malpensa, displacing approximately 2.5 million passengers.

Facilities
Linate Airport features one three-story passenger terminal building. The ground level contains the check-in and separate baggage reclaim facilities as well as service counters and a secondary departure gate area for bus-boarding. The first floor features the main departure area with several shops, restaurants and service facilities. The second floor is used for office space. The terminal building features five aircraft stands, all of which are equipped with jet-bridges. Several more parking positions are available on the apron which are reached from several bus-boarding gates.

Airlines and destinations

The following airlines operate scheduled services to and from Linate Airport:

Statistics

Ground transport

Car
The airport is located in Viale Enrico Forlanini next to its intersection with autostrada A51 (exit 6 Aeroporto Linate). A51 is part of the city's highway ring, so the airport can be reached from any direction.

Bus and coach
The airport can be reached by the ATM bus 73 from Piazza Duomo in the city centre, as well as by coach services from other places within the city. Coaches from and to Monza, Brescia and Milan Malpensa Airport are also available.

Metro
The Milan metro line 4 connects the airport (station Linate Aeroporto) to the city centre starting from November 2022, with a travel time of about 15 minutes.

Incidents and accidents
 Linate Airport was the site of the Linate Airport disaster on 8 October 2001, when Scandinavian Airlines Flight 686, which was bound for Copenhagen Airport, collided with a business jet that, in fog, had inadvertently taxied onto the runway already in use. This collision later resulted in criminal legal proceedings against 11 staff including an air traffic controller, flight safety officials and management officials from the airport. All 114 people on both aircraft were killed, as well as four people on the ground. The Linate Airport disaster remains the deadliest air disaster in Italian history.
 On 15 June 2005, a light aircraft safely landed on taxiway 'T' after its pilot had mistaken it for runway 36R. Following that incident, a safety recommendation was issued. It suggested the use of different numbers to help differentiate between runways. This change was enacted at the beginning of July 2007, when 18R/36L became 17/35 and 18L/36R became 18/36.
 On 3 October 2021, a privately owned Pilatus PC-12 that had just taken off from Linate Airport crashed into an empty building, killing all eight passengers and crew on board. The plane was heading for Olbia on the island of Sardinia, but it came down soon after takeoff on the outskirts of the city near the metro station at San Donato Milanese, near Milan. The victims included businessman Dan Petrescu, one of the wealthiest people in Romania at the time; his wife, his son, and five others, including a one-year-old baby. Several empty parked cars caught fire after the crash near the metro station, emergency workers said. Firefighters worked to extinguish the flames rising from the building, which was reportedly under reforms.

References

External links 

 
 

Buildings and structures in Milan
Metropolitan City of Milan
Airports in Milan
Segrate
Peschiera Borromeo